Theodore Sizer (March 19, 1892 – June 21, 1967) was an American professor of the history of art at Yale University and a director of the Yale University Art Gallery in New Haven, Connecticut. He was named the first Pursuivant of Arms for Yale University in 1963.

Biography
His parents, Robert Ryland Sizer, a lumber industry executive, and Mary T. Thomsen, were married in 1890. Theodore, their first child, was born in New York City on March 19, 1892. During his early life, he was given the nickname "Tubby". He was graduated cum laude with a B.S. degree in Fine Arts from Harvard University in 1915. On October 14, 1916, he married Caroline Wheelwright Foster.

In World War I, he enlisted as a private in the 27th Infantry Division and was promoted to corporal, then sergeant. After officer training, he was commissioned a first lieutenant and served in Philadelphia loading transports. After his discharge from the army in January, 1919, he made several trips to South America for his employer. In 1922, he was named curator of prints and of Asian art at the Cleveland Museum of Art, where he worked until 1927.

Starting in 1927 at Yale University as an associate professor of the history of art, he became a professor in 1931 and held that position until 1957, when he retired as professor emeritus. Also in 1927, he started as an associate director of the Yale University Art Gallery and was its director from 1940 to 1947.

In World War II, he served in the Monuments, Fine Arts, and Archives program as a lieutenant colonel. He was the first chief of the program operations for Germany in March 1944. He had to stop this effort due to illness and received a medical discharge in May 1944. For his work, he was awarded the Order of the Crown of Italy with rank of Commander from the Italian government in 1945. He received a Guggenheim Fellowship in 1947 for Fine Arts Research. He was elected a member of the American Antiquarian Society in 1948.

He became an expert in heraldry and was commissioned in 1953 by the secretary of Yale, Carl A. Lohmann, to design banners for ten Yale colleges and schools for commencement. He received the Yale Medal in 1962 for service to the university. In 1963, he was named Yale's first Pursuivant of Arms. He designed a new flag for the city of St. Louis, Missouri that was officially adopted on February 3, 1964.

Sizer published over one hundred and sixty items, especially about the life and works of the American artist John Trumbull.

Works

See also
 Theodore R. Sizer – his son, known for education reform

References

External links
 
 

1892 births
1967 deaths
Writers from New York City
Writers from New Haven, Connecticut
Harvard University alumni
Yale University faculty
American art historians
Military personnel from New York City
United States Army officers
Monuments men
Directors of museums in the United States
Flag designers
Members of the American Antiquarian Society
Military personnel from New Haven, Connecticut
Historians from New York (state)
Historians from Connecticut